The Court of Flags Resort was a resort located in Orlando, Florida, USA.

History
The resort was built by US Steel in 1972 and opened in 1974. It was a popular upscale resort when it opened, and later in its life it became more of a budget resort. In 2006, it was demolished to make room for the new Citymark of Orlando; this never materialized. It was located near International Drive, on Major Boulevard just across the street from Universal Orlando Resort, and just across the street from the now defunct Mystery Fun House. The lot is now the site of Lexus of Orlando.

Name changes
The resort changed names a few times during its life:
 
 When opened it actually was under three franchises at one time. Admiral Benbow Inn (one building), Sheraton Motor Inn (two buildings), and Quality Inn (one building)
 Ramada Court of Flags – At least as early as 1979 to 1994
 Delta Orlando Resort – 1991 to 1999 (closing)
 In 2001, the hotel was to be remodeled into a Doubletree resort. After tourism declined following the September 11 attacks, the plans never materialized.

Construction
The Court of Flags Resort is noted for its unique construction type. The rooms were stacked on top of each other and with framing and concrete added around them. They used the same system at the Polynesian Resort and part of the Contemporary Resort at Walt Disney World.

U.S. Steel movie clip showing process of how the rooms were installed at the Contemporary. The buildings were all built off site the same way for both the slide in and stack type construction.

US Steel thought this new system of building would catch on and revolutionize construction but the system had flaws that were not known until later. The buildings shifted and settled. The air space between the rooms kept too much moisture and let mildew grow.

The resort consisted of four separate guest room buildings. It housed a total of 800 rooms with 16 suites. It also had three pools and three restaurants.

References

External links 
Court of Flags Pictures and info at BigFloridaCountry.com
U.S. Steel movie clip of the Contemporary Resort Construction, compliments of BigFloridaCountry.com

Hotel buildings completed in 1972
Demolished hotels in Florida
1974 establishments in Florida
2006 disestablishments in Florida
U.S. Steel